Thomas Schirò (born 25 April 2000) is an Italian professional footballer who plays as a midfielder for  club Turris on loan from Crotone.

Club career

Inter 
Born in Novara, Schirò was a youth exponent of Inter.

Loan to Carrarese 
On 14 September 2020, Schirò was loaned to Serie C club Carrarese on a season-long loan deal. Nine days later, on 23 September, he made his professional debut for the club playing as a starter and he also scored his first goal in the 7th minute of a 4–0 home win over Ambrosiana in the first round of Coppa Italia, he played the entire match. Four days later Schirò made his league debut as a starter in a 0–0 home draw against Pro Patria, he was replaced by Lorenzo Borri in the 88th minute. On 17 October he played his first entire match in Serie C, a 0–0 away draw against Lecco. Five days later, on 21 October, he scored his first goal in Serie C, as a substitute, in the 80th minute of a 2–0 home win over Pistoiese. Schirò ended his season-long loan to Carrarese with 34 appearances, 2 goals and 1 assist.

Crotone 
On 20 August 2021, he moved to Crotone on permanent basis. For the 2022–23 season, Schirò was not included on the club's league squad and only appeared for the Under-19 team. On 31 January 2023, he was loaned by Turris.

Career statistics

Club

Honours

Club 
Inter Primavera

 Campionato Primavera 1: 2017-18
 Supercoppa Primavera: 2018
 Torneo di Viareggio: 2018

References

External links

2000 births
People from Novara
Footballers from Piedmont
Sportspeople from the Province of Novara
Living people
Italian people of French descent
Italian footballers
Association football midfielders
Serie C players
Serie B players
Inter Milan players
Carrarese Calcio players
F.C. Crotone players
S.S. Turris Calcio players